WestView Health Centre is a medical facility with a 24-hour emergency department located in Stony Plain, Alberta that is operated by Alberta Health Services. It is a 68-bed facility and features hospice care within its continuing care unit.

Services 
Services offered at the Westview Health Centre include the following.

Addiction and Mental Health - Outpatient Counseling Services, Adult
Addiction and Mental Health - Suburban Community Assessment and Treatment Services, Adult
Adult Day Support Program
Ambulatory IV Clinic
Cafeteria Services
Child Health Clinics Community
Colonoscopy
Community Audiology Services
Continuing Care Services
Diagnostic Imaging Services
Drop In for New Mothers / Families and Infants
Emergency Services
Gastroscopy
General Radiography (X-Ray)
Gift Shop
Health Information - Access and Disclosure
Health Information / Records Management
Healthy Beginnings Postpartum Program
Hospitals
Immunization - Adult and Seniors Services
Immunization - Infant and Preschool Services
Immunization - School Services
Laboratory Services
Lost and Found
Nutrition Counselling - Adult
Patient Email Well Wishes
Patient Food Services
Patient Information
Protective Services
Public Health Centres
Pulmonary Rehabilitation Program
Registration
School Health Nursing Services
School Health Services
Sexual Assault Response Team
Sigmoidoscopy
Social Work
Spiritual Care
Switchboard
Tuberculosis Testing
Ultrasound
Volunteer Resources
WestView Geriatric Assessment Team
Wound Care Clinic

References 

Edmonton Metropolitan Region
Hospitals in Alberta